Kyle Daniel Tucker (born January 17, 1997) is an American professional baseball right fielder for the Houston Astros of Major League Baseball (MLB). The Astros selected Tucker with the fifth pick in the first round of the 2015 MLB draft, and he made his MLB debut in 2018.

A native of Tampa, Florida, Tucker won Florida's Gatorade Player of the Year Award while attending and playing for Henry B. Plant High School.  In 2021, he was selected for the All-MLB Team for the first time.  The following year, he won each of his first World Series championship, MLB All-Star selection and Gold Glove Award. For his career, he has accumulated a 12.9 baseball-reference WAR and 129 OPS+.

High school career
Tucker attended Henry B. Plant High School in Tampa, Florida, and played for their baseball team. He appeared in Perfect Game's All American Classic. Tucker was named Florida's Gatorade Player of the Year in 2015.

Projected to be a first round pick in the 2015 MLB draft, the Houston Astros selected Tucker fifth overall. He officially signed on June 15.

Professional career

Minor leagues
Tucker played for the Greeneville Astros of the Rookie-level Appalachian League. He began the 2016 season with the Quad Cities River Bandits of the Class A Midwest League, and received a midseason promotion to the Lancaster JetHawks of the Class A-Advanced California League. Tucker hit .285/.360/.438 with 32 stolen bases, nine home runs, and 69 runs batted in (RBIs) in 2016.

Tucker began the 2017 season with the Buies Creek Astros of the Class A-Advanced Carolina League, and was promoted to the Corpus Christi Hooks of the Class AA Texas League in May. He appeared in the 2017 All-Star Futures Game. He finished the season batting a combined .274/.346/.528 with 25 home runs and 90 RBIs between Buies Creek and Corpus Christi. After the season, the Astros assigned Tucker to the Mesa Solar Sox of the Arizona Fall League.

Tucker began the 2018 season with the Fresno Grizzlies of the Class AAA Pacific Coast League. After he batted .306 in 80 games, the Astros promoted him to the major leagues on July 7.

Houston Astros

Early major league career (2018–20)
Tucker made his major league debut on July 7, 2018, versus the Chicago White Sox.  He collected his first major league hit and RBI that day.  He batted .141/.236/.203 in 72 plate appearances for the Astros in 2018.

Tucker spent the 2019 minor league season with the Round Rock Express, hitting .266/.350/.555/.905 with 34 home runs, 97 RBIs, and 30 stolen bases. Tucker was promoted to the Astros on September 2, 2019. In 2019 with the Astros, he batted .269/.319/.537 with four home runs and 11 RBIs in 67 at bats, while stealing five bases without being caught.

In 2020, playing in 58 of the abbreviated sixty game season, Tucker batted .268/.325/.512 with six triples (leading the American League), nine home runs, and 42 RBIs in 209 at bats, and stole eight bases while being caught just once.  He also placed sixth in the league in RBI, sixth in extra-base hits (27), and seventh in stolen bases.  He played in 13 playoff games, batting .306/.327/.367 before a season-ending loss to the Tampa Bay Rays in the American League Championship Series (ALCS).

All-MLB Second Team (2021)
Tucker authored a breakout season in 2021: from May 1 through the end of the season, he batted .320 and led the AL in on-base percentage, slugging and OPS.  By hitting his 30th home run on October 3, Tucker became the third Astro to have hit 30 home runs hit in one season before turning age 25.  In September and October, he batted .346 with eight home runs, 20 runs scored, 19 RBIs, a .438 on-base percentage, and a .692 slugging percentage for a 1.130 OPS.  He was awarded the AL Player of the Month for September, his first career monthly award.

In his first full, unshortened, major league season, Tucker reached career-highs in nearly every offensive category, batting .294/.359./.557/.917, with 37 doubles, 30 home runs, 92 RBIs, 14 stolen bases, 282 total bases, and 147 OPS+ in 140 games played.  He ranked ninth in the AL in batting, third in slugging percentage and OPS, fifth in doubles and OPS+, and tenth in Wins Above Replacement (5.7 WAR, per Baseball-Reference).  He was named as a Gold Glove finalist in right field with +11 Defensive Runs Saved (DRS), tied with Joey Gallo and Aaron Judge for second place behind Adolis García.  Tucker was announced as a finalist for the Silver Slugger Award for outfielders on October 25, 2021; the three outfielder winners were Teoscar Hernández, Judge and Cedric Mullins  Tucker received his first selection as a Sporting News AL All-Star at outfield, and to the All-MLB Second Team.

In Game 4 of the 2021 American League Division Series (ALDS) against the Chicago White Sox on October 12, Tucker stole second and third base in the fourth inning to become the first Astro to steal two bases in the same inning of a postseason game.  He slashed .279/.333/.541 in 61 postseason at bats, stole five bases, hit four home runs, and led both leagues in postseason runs batted in (RBI) with fifteen.

2022
In 2022 he had another great year as he batted .257/.330/.478 with a 128 OPS+ and a 5.3 baseball-reference WAR in 544 at bats. He swung at a higher percentage of pitches in the strike zone (84.0%) than any other major league batter. He played 147 games in right field, and three at DH.  He received nomination for the AL Silver Slugger Award in right field/ and was an All-star. He finished 15th in the AL MVP-voting.

Through his 13 defensive runs saved, Tucker was awarded the AL 2022 Gold Glove Award for his play in right field. He was also second in the league at his position in assists (8).  Tucker became the third Astro, following Michael Bourn (2009-10) and César Cedeño (1972-76),. to win a Gold Glove as an outfielder, and first since 2010. 

An early-season slump for Tucker in 2022 included a 4-for-46 span to start the season.  On April 27, his three-run double in the fifth inning versus the Texas Rangers scored the decisive runs for a 4–3 Astros win; he collected seven RBI in the first three games of that series.  Pinch hitting in the eighth inning of the next game, his home run again provided the margin of victory for the Astros, 3–2, after Rangers starter Martín Pérez had taken a perfect game into the seventh inning.

At Fenway Park on May 17, Tucker tied his career high of six RBI, including hitting one of five home runs in the second inning versus Nathan Eovaldi of the Boston Red Sox, tying the major league record for a team in one inning.  In the fourth inning, he added a grand slam.  While playing the Chicago White Sox on June 17, 2022, Tucker extended a career-high hitting streak to 15 games.

Tucker was named a reserve outfielder to the MLB All-Star Game at Dodger Stadium, his first career selection.  Some totals at the time included a .259 average, 16 home runs, fourth place ranking in the AL in RBI (58) and tied for fifth in steals (14).  He garnered 10 Defensive Runs Saved, per Fangraphs, tied with Brett Phillips for the lead among AL outfielders. During the season, he became the seventh player in MLB history to steal 40 bases and hit 60 home runs in his first 350 games, doing so in his 329th game in the majors.

Tucker's second grand slam of the season on August 12 catalyzed a 7–5 Astros win versus the Oakland Athletics.  On August 18, he tied a career high with four hits versus the White Sox in a 21–5 win that included 25 hits, tied for both the second-highest scoring output and most hits in team history.  A double in the third inning versus the Minnesota Twins on August 24 extended a hitting streak to a new career-high 16 games for Tucker.  The hitting streak extended to 17 games and ended on August 27.  Tucker reached 20 stolen base on September 3, giving him his first 20/20 (20-home run, 20-stolen base) campaign.  On September 20, Tucker, facing his hometown Rays, drove in his 100th run of the season to become the 18th player in club history to accomplish the feat, and first full-time Astros outfielder since Carlos Lee in 2009.  The following day, Tucker hit the go-ahead home run the eighth inning that resulted in a 5–2 win, finishing off a series sweep at Tropicana Field, the first ever for Houston in Tampa Bay.  He hit his 30th home run of the season on October 4 versus the Philadelphia Phillies, joining Jeff Bagwell as the only players in Astros history to have reached 30 home runs, 100 RBI, and 25 stolen bases in the same season.

In Game 1 of the 2022 World Series, Tucker hit consecutive home runs versus Aaron Nola, becoming the first Astros player with multiple home runs in a World Series game.  Although they would lose that game 6-5, the Astros defeated the Phillies in six games to give Tucker his first World Series title, with Tucker catching a fly ball hit by Nick Castellanos to record the final out. In the World Series Tucker hit .190/:280/.524 with an .804 OPS in 21 AB.

International career
On August 27, 2022, Tucker committed to play for the United States in the 2023 World Baseball Classic (WBC).  During the quarterfinal game versus Venezuela, Tucker homered off Astros teammate Luis García on the way to a 9–7 win for Team USA.

Personal life
Tucker's older brother, Preston, is also a professional baseball player (he also played for the Astros, playing in 2015 and 2016).

On December 23, 2022, Tucker announced via Instagram his engagement to girlfriend Samantha Scott.  They both graduated Plant High School in 2015 and began dating in 2017 while Tucker was playing in the Astros' minor league system and Scott was attending Florida State University.  Scott's younger brother, Connor, is also an outfielder who was a first-round draft selection of the Miami Marlins in 2018.

Awards

See also

 Houston Astros award winners and league leaders
 List of Major League Baseball annual triples leaders
 List of people from Tampa, Florida

References

External links

1997 births
Living people
American League All-Stars
Baseball players from Tampa, Florida
Major League Baseball outfielders
Houston Astros players
Gold Glove Award winners
Gulf Coast Astros players
Greeneville Astros players
Quad Cities River Bandits players
Lancaster JetHawks players
Buies Creek Astros players
Corpus Christi Hooks players
Fresno Grizzlies players
Round Rock Express players
Henry B. Plant High School alumni
2023 World Baseball Classic players